Spilarctia nana is a moth in the family Erebidae. It was described by Rob de Vos and Daawia Suhartawan in 2011. It is found in Papua and Papua New Guinea. The habitat consists of mountainous areas.

References

N
Endemic fauna of Papua New Guinea
Moths of Papua New Guinea
Moths described in 2011